Christopher Edwards Gadsden (November 25, 1785 – June 24, 1852) was the fourth Episcopal Bishop of South Carolina.

Early life
Gadsden was born in Charleston, South Carolina in 1785, the son of Phillip Gadsden and his wife, Catherine Edwards.  He was a grandson of Christopher Gadsden, the South Carolina Revolutionary leader.  As a youth, he attended both the Episcopal Church of his father and his mother's Congregational Church.

Beginning in his junior year, Gadsden attended Yale University, graduating in 1804.  He was ordained deacon in the Episcopal Church in 1807 by Bishop Moore, and in 1810 was ordained priest by Bishop Madison.

Career

Soon thereafter, he became rector of St. John's Church in Berkeley County, South Carolina.  In 1814, Gadsden became rector of St. Philip's Church in Charleston, the oldest congregation in the diocese.  He received a doctorate of divinity the following year from South Carolina College.

In 1840, after the death of Bishop Bowen, a dispute arose in the diocese over who would succeed him.  Gadsden was elected, and was consecrated bishop in Trinity Church in Boston.  Gadsden was the 35th bishop in the ECUSA, and was consecrated by Alexander Viets Griswold, George Washington Doane, and Samuel Allen McCoskry.  Gadsden was active in expanding the membership of the Episcopal Church in South Carolina, usually visiting each congregation once a year.  In 1852, at the diocese convention, he announced that ill health would prevent him from continuing his ministry, and he died shortly thereafter, in June of that year.

Personal life
He married Eliza Bowman in 1816.  She died in 1826, and Gadsden remarried in 1830 to Jane Dewees, the youngest daughter of William Dewees.  He had no children by his first marriage, but had eight with his second wife.

Notes

References

External links
 Web site of the Episcopal Church
 Web site of the Diocese of South Carolina

1785 births
1852 deaths
Clergy from Charleston, South Carolina
Episcopal bishops of South Carolina
Yale University alumni
19th-century American Episcopalians